Richard William Thies (born 1938 in Reno, Nevada) is an actor. He is credited in his film and television appearances as Dick Thies, was a Western actor, playing villains in the 1960s.

Personal
Dick Thies is the son of Alfred & Melba Thies, husband of actress Kathleen Mitchell (divorced 20 January 1983 in Los Angeles, California). and father of actress Brooke Theiss.

Filmography
 Route 66 (1960–62) (TV), played Waldo 
 The Talisman (1966), aka The Savage American, played Buford
 When Vacations Attack (2011) (TV), played himself in episode #1.5

References

1938 births
American male film actors
American male television actors
Living people
People from Greater Los Angeles